Pervez Aziz (born 23 December 1975) is a Pakistani cricketer. He played in 41 first-class and 17 List A matches between 1997 and 2007. He made his Twenty20 debut on 25 April 2005, for Rawalpindi Rams in the 2004–05 National Twenty20 Cup.

References

External links
 

1975 births
Living people
Pakistani cricketers
Rawalpindi cricketers
Rawalpindi Rams cricketers
Place of birth missing (living people)